This article provides details of international football games played by the DR Congo national football team from before independence to 1971, at which point the Democratic Republic of the Congo was renamed Zaire.

Pre-independence

Post-independence

1963

1964

1965

1966

1967

1968

1969

1970

1971

References 

Democratic Republic of the Congo national football team matches